Avenida Atlântica (Portuguese for Atlantic Avenue) is a major seaside avenue in Rio de Janeiro, Brazil. It is 4 kilometers long, and spans the entire length of the neighbourhoods of Copacabana and Leme.

Layout

In the stretch between its extremity in Leme and its crossing with Princesa Isabel Avenue (about 800 meters long), Avenida Atlântica has two car lanes in each direction, and from there to its Copacabana extremity, it has three lanes. It also has a portuguese pavement promenade with a wave pattern, as well as a bicycle lane between the promenade from the car lanes. 

There is a military base at each of the two extremities of the avenue: Forte de Copacabana in Copacabana, and Forte Duque de Caxias in Leme. Both are owned and administered by the Brazilian army.

Buildings

Avenida Atlântica is lined with residential buildings, restaurants, hotels (including the Copacabana Palace) and a few shops. Most buildings in the avenue have 11 floors, and were built with no empty space between. This is also the case in the rest of Copacabana and Leme].

Events

Every year there is a very large new years celebration along the entire avenue  (on Copacabana Beach), which attracts hundreds of thousands of visitors. The beach is also a frequently used as a venue for free concerts and sport events, hosting the marathon swimming, triathlon and beach volleyball competitions in the 2007 Pan American Games and the same competitions in the 2016 Summer Olympics.

Gallery

References

Streets in Rio de Janeiro (city)
Copacabana, Rio de Janeiro